Hansdih is a place in Bihar, India, situated beside the Jamui - Lakhisarai state highway.

This place is a mixture of Hindu and Muslim religion and famous for unity. About 3/4 of total population is Hindu and rest Muslim.

It is about 2 km from Jamui city. A mosque is at the centre of Hansdih. The people of Hansdih speaks Hindi. Most of people have their own business here. This place comes within Jamui Municipality region. In future expansion of Jamui city, Hansdih might be the center of city.

References

Villages in Jamui district